The Detroit Tigers' 1988 season was a season in American baseball. The Tigers, fresh off of losing the American League pennant to Minnesota Twins, were attempting to repeat as American League East champions after winning the division on the final day of the previous season. The Tigers hit five grand slams, the most in MLB in 1988.

Offseason
 October 23, 1987: Dickie Noles was returned by the Tigers to the Chicago Cubs as part of an earlier agreement (Noles was loaned to the Tigers on September 22).
 March 23, 1988: Mark Huismann was signed as a free agent by the Tigers.
 March 24, 1988: Balvino Gálvez was traded by the Tigers to the Minnesota Twins for Billy Beane.

Regular season

Season standings

Record vs. opponents

Notable transactions
 August 31, 1988: Rey Palacios and Mark Lee were traded by the Tigers to the Kansas City Royals for Ted Power
 August 31, 1988: The Tigers sent Chris Hoiles and players to be named later to the Baltimore Orioles for Fred Lynn

Draft picks
 June 1, 1988: 1988 Major League Baseball draft
Rico Brogna was drafted by the Tigers in the 1st round (26th pick). Player signed June 18, 1988.
Dave Haas was drafted by the Tigers in the 15th round.

Roster

Player stats

Batting

Starters by position
Note: Pos = Position; G = Games played; AB = At bats; H = Hits; Avg. = Batting average; HR = Home runs; RBI = Runs batted in

Other batters
Note: G = Games played; AB = At bats; H = Hits; Avg. = Batting average; HR = Home runs; RBI = Runs batted in

Pitching

Starting pitchers
Note: G = Games pitched; IP = Innings pitched; W = Wins; L = Losses; ERA = Earned run average; SO = Strikeouts

Other pitchers
Note: G = Games pitched; IP = Innings pitched; W = Wins; L = Losses; ERA = Earned run average; SO = Strikeouts

Relief pitchers 
Note: G = Games pitched; W = Wins; L = Losses; SV = Saves; ERA = Earned run average; SO = Strikeouts

Farm system

<ref>Johnson, Lloyd, and Wolff, Miles, ed., The Encyclopedia of Minor League Baseball". Durham, North Carolina: Baseball America, 1997</ref>

References

External links

1988 Detroit Tigers season at Baseball Reference''

Detroit Tigers seasons
Detroit Tigers
Detroit Tiger
1988 in Detroit